MLB Whiparound was an American baseball nightly television show on Fox Sports 1 hosted by Chris Myers and Kevin Burkhardt with Joel Klatt alternating as a secondary presenter. The presenter is  joined by either 1 or 2 analysts from the group of Mark Sweeney, Eric Karros, Dontrelle Willis, Pete Rose, Nick Swisher, Alex Rodriguez, A. J. Pierzynski, Frank Thomas, and Terry Collins, as well as Fox Sports' Jon Paul Morosi and Ken Rosenthal.

Description and format 
The show features Quick-Turnaround Highlights of In-Progress Games, News, and Analysis. The show is located in Studio A (Adjacent to Fox Sports Live) in Los Angeles. The show airs on Mondays through Fridays at 11 pm ET unless there is live programming in which case it airs at Midnight ET.

See also 
 Major League Baseball on Fox
 Baseball Tonight
 MLB Tonight

2014 American television series debuts
Major League Baseball on Fox
Major League Baseball studio shows
Fox Sports 1 original programming